District 16 of the Texas Senate is a senatorial district that currently serves a portion of Dallas county in the U.S. state of Texas.

The current Senator from District 16 is Nathan M. Johnson.

Top 5 biggest cities in district
District 17 has a population of 816,670 with 614,614 that is at voting age from the 2010 census.

Election history
Election history of District 25 from 1992.

Previous elections

2018

2014

2012

2008

2004

2002

1998

1994

1992

District officeholders

Notes

References

16
Dallas County, Texas